The molecular formula C15H25NO2 may refer to:

 Dihydroalprenolol
 2,5-Dimethoxy-4-butylamphetamine
 Nupharamine, an alkaloid found in Nuphar japonica
 Xibenolol

Molecular formulas